Sam Barsky is an American artist and internet celebrity. He knits sweaters of landmarks, then takes selfies in front of the landmarks while wearing them. He also knits sweaters of Jewish and other holidays.

His sweaters are knitted without a pattern, freehanding them as he goes along. His sweaters have been displayed in numerous galleries and at the American Visionary Arts Museum. As of January 11, 2022, he has knitted 155 sweaters free-handed.

Background
Barsky started knitting in 1999 after he dropped out of nursing school due to health issues, and first tried to teach himself how to knit from a book he borrowed from the library. Soon after, he met the owners of a local yarn shop, who taught him.

His first sweater was knitted in 2000 and featured a covered bridge and waterwheel. Other early sweaters depicted a waterfall, lake, river, and castle. He made a Twin Towers sweater before the September 11 attacks.

In 2017 an article about his sweaters was published on Imgur. Originally he did not take selfies in front of landmarks, but later did. He has reportedly knitted 119 sweaters for his travels. Though he receives many requests, Barsky does not sell his sweaters because he says it is impossible to be a "human sweater mill." However, he does sell t-shirts with prints of his designs on his website.

Images depicted on Barsky's sweaters

Landmarks
Some of the landmarks Barsky has featured are:
 The Golden Gate Bridge
 Times Square
 Stonehenge
 African Safari
 Western Wall
 Bahá'í gardens
 Dead Sea
 Ein Gedi
 Niagara Falls
 Eiffel Tower
 Oriole Park at Camden Yards
 Tower Bridge
 Hollywood sign
 Las Vegas Strip
 London Bridge (Lake Havasu City)

Holidays
 Hanukkah
 Sukkot
 Shavuot
 Passover
 Martin Luther King Jr. Day
 Groundhog Day

Other
 Field of pylons 
 Coral reef
 Playing cards
 His 100th sweater he describes as his "sweater of sweaters."

Barsky has also knitted items other than sweaters, including a framed picture of the Beth Am sanctuary.

Personal life
Barsky was raised Orthodox Jewish, and practices today as a Conservative Jew and is a kohein. He is married to his wife Deborah.

He has lupus and a neurological disorder, but he says he does not let it stand in the way of his knitting.

References

External links
 Official website
 Sam Barsky's Instagram

People from Baltimore
Artists from Baltimore
People in knitting
People with lupus
Living people
Year of birth missing (living people)
Jewish American artists
American textile artists
Levites
Jews and Judaism in Baltimore
American Conservative Jews
Artists with disabilities
American Internet celebrities
21st-century American Jews